Rush Creek Valley is an unincorporated community in Jefferson Township, Washington County, in the U.S. state of Indiana.

History
The first post office in Rush Creek Valley was established in 1871, and operated until it was discontinued in 1901.

Geography

References

Unincorporated communities in Washington County, Indiana
Unincorporated communities in Indiana